I Give You My Heart may refer to:

"I Give You My Heart" (Hillsong song), 1996
"I Give You My Heart" (Mr. President song), 1996

See also
"Give U My Heart", 1992 song by Babyface featuring Toni Braxton
"I Give My Heart to You", a song by Billy Ray Cyrus on the 1998 album Shot Full of Love
"If I Give My Heart to You", a 1954 song